The Canadian Civil Liberties Association (CCLA) is a nonprofit organization in Canada devoted to the defence of civil liberties and constitutional rights.

History
The CCLA was founded in 1964 in Toronto, prompted by the Ontario government's proposal of a bill that would have granted special powers to the police in the face of a rise in organized crime.  Its predecessor was the Association for Civil Liberties (ACL), which at its foundation had been intended to address national issues, but had become focused primarily on issues in Ontario. The ACL was led by Irving Himel, and in response to the bill, he gathered human rights leaders in Toronto, including Pierre Berton, June Callwood,  Bora Laskin, Mark MacGuigan, Harry Arthurs, and John Keiller MacKay, and they formed the CCLA with Mackay as its honorary president.

In 1968, the CCLA won a grant from the Ford Foundation to study due process in Canadian lower courts and used the findings as a guide for its advocacy in the ensuing years.

The CCLA was one of the few groups in Canada that protested the 1970 invocation of the War Measures Act by then Prime Minister of Canada Pierre Trudeau in response to the October Crisis in Quebec.

In the opinion of Dominique Clément, its most enduring contribution was its influence on the drafting of the Canadian Charter of Rights and Freedoms, which was enacted in 1982.

Leadership
Alan Borovoy served as general counsel of the organization from 1968 to 2009 and under his leadership, he and the CCLA became famous throughout Canada as defenders of free speech and civil liberties. He continued as general counsel emeritus from 2009 until his death in 2015.

Nathalie Des Rosiers was CCLA's general counsel from 2009 to 2013.

Sukanya Pillay was executive director and general counsel from 2014 until 2017, and had been acting general counsel from 2013 to 2014.

Former Attorney-General of Ontario Michael Bryant was appointed executive director and general counsel in 2018  and served until January 1, 2022 when he left to become executive director of Legal Aid BC.

Noa Mendelsohn-Aviv was appointed executive director and general counsel on February 9, 2022. She had previously been acting executive director and general counsel from 2017 to 2018.

Further reading

Archival holdings
Canadian Civil Liberties Association fonds at Library and Archives Canada, reference number R9833.
Canadian Civil Liberties Association - Canadian Political Parties and Political Interest Groups - Web Archive created by the University of Toronto Libraries

See also
 Canadian Civil Liberties Education Trust
 British Columbia Civil Liberties Association
 American Civil Liberties Union
 American Civil Rights Union
 New York Civil Liberties Union

References

External links
 

Legal organizations based in Ontario
Government watchdog groups in Canada
Civil liberties advocacy groups
Legal advocacy organizations based in Canada
Organizations established in 1964
Political advocacy groups in Canada
Human rights organizations based in Canada
Civil rights organizations in Canada